Homoioptera is an extinct genus of winged insects from the Upper Carboniferous of Europe.

It contains the following species:
†H. gigantea Agnus 1902
†H. kortumi Brauckmann and Herd 2002
†H. latipenne Handlirsch 1904
†H. vorhallensis Brauckmann and Koch 1982
†H. woodwardi Brongniart 1890

References

Carboniferous insects
Prehistoric insect genera